Symperasmus affinis is a species of beetle in the family Cerambycidae. It was described by Thomson in 1865.

References

Acanthoderini
Beetles described in 1865